Dácio Campos (born 18 December 1963) is a former professional tennis player from Brazil, and TV commentator.

Career
Campos played collegiate tennis in the United States, for the University of Houston.

In 1985 he appeared in three Davis Cup ties for Brazil, against Venezuela, Colombia and Mexico. He won four rubbers, three in singles and one in doubles.

At the 1985 French Open, Campos played eighth seed Eliot Teltscher in the first round and lost in straight sets. It would be his only Grand Slam singles match. He did however appear in the men's doubles at nine Grand Slam tournaments.

Campos was a mixed doubles quarter-finalist at the 1986 French Open, with Regina Maršíková as his partner.

He won one Grand Prix tournament during his career, which was as a doubles player, at the 1989 Guarujá Open.

Grand Prix career finals

Doubles: 1 (1–0)

Challenger titles

Singles: (1)

Doubles: (6)

References

1963 births
Living people
Brazilian male tennis players
Houston Cougars men's tennis players
People from Piracicaba
Sportspeople from São Paulo (state)